Abdally may refer to:
Abdallı, Azerbaijan
Abdal, Azerbaijan